SHINEmk (also known as Shine or Shine MK) was an English Christian pop group made up of Nicki Rogers, Natasha Andrews, Loretta Andrews and Hanne Pettersen. ShineMK began in 1998 as an educational outfit touring schools in the Thames Valley area of England. They toured in the USA, where they sold over 400,000 records. SHINEmk was nominated for two Dove Awards for Do It Right. SHINEmk sang "Left Behind" with Bryan Duncan for Left Behind: The Movie.

Disestablishment
The group disbanded in 2001 to pursue solo careers. Nicki Rogers went on to release two solo albums, Colour Scheme and Feeder Lane, Loretta and Natasha Andrews formed Brown:Music with Johann which recently supported Take That on the UK leg of their world tour.

Discography
Extended Play (1999) 
Do It Right (2000)
Keep on Moving (2001)

See also
Christian girl group

References

External links
Nicki Rogers
Brown:Music

All-female bands
American Christian musical groups
English Christian musical groups
Christian pop groups
Musical groups established in 1998
Musical groups disestablished in 2001